Bhoti may refer to several Tibetic languages:

Bhoti Kinnauri
Ladakhi language (Bhoti)
Spiti Bhoti
Stod Bhoti